The 1979 Iowa State Cyclones football team represented Iowa State University as a member of the Big Eight Conference during the 1979 NCAA Division I-A football season. Led by first-year head coach Donnie Duncan, the Cyclones compiled an overall record of 3–8 with a mark of 2–5 in conference play, placing in a three-way tie for fifth in the Big Eight. The team played its home games at Cylcone Stadium in Ames, Iowa.

Schedule

Roster

References

Iowa State
Iowa State Cyclones football seasons
Iowa State Cyclones football